Horace Henry Husler (1890−1959), born and brought up in Sheffield, was a professional footballer who played as a goalkeeper for The Wednesday, Huddersfield Town and Doncaster Rovers.

During his time at Doncaster he had not been fully paid. The FA intervened on his behalf, resulting in the suspension of the club through most of December 1915 when the two parties settled their differences.

References 

1890 births
1959 deaths
Footballers from Sheffield
English footballers
Association football goalkeepers
English Football League players
Sheffield Wednesday F.C. players
Huddersfield Town A.F.C. players
Doncaster Rovers F.C. players
Midland Football League players